The AJ10 is a hypergolic rocket engine manufactured by Aerojet Rocketdyne (previously Aerojet). It has been used to propel the upper stages of several launch vehicles, including the Delta II and Titan III. Variants were and are used as the service propulsion engine for the Apollo command and service module, in the Space Shuttle Orbital Maneuvering System, and on the European Service Module – part of NASA's Orion spacecraft.

Variants

It was first used in the Delta-A/Able second stage of the Vanguard rocket, in the AJ10-118 configuration. It was initially fueled by nitric acid and UDMH.  An AJ10 engine was first fired in flight during the third Vanguard launch, on 17 March 1958, which successfully placed the Vanguard 1 satellite into orbit.

The AJ10-101 engine was used on an uprated version of the Able stage, used on Atlas-Able and Thor-Able rockets. The first AJ10-101 flight, with a Thor-Able, occurred on 23 April 1958; however, the Thor failed before the upper Able stage fired. The second flight, which saw the first in flight firing of an AJ10-101 engine, occurred on 10 July 1958.

The AJ10-138 engine was originally developed for Vanguard and Able, and was flown from 1964 to 1980.

The AJ10-137 engine (20,500 lbf (91 kN) of thrust) was used in the Apollo service module's service propulsion system from first flight in 1966.  Trans-Earth injection, from lunar orbit, was the most critical usage of this engine during the Apollo program. 
This version used Aerozine 50 (a 1:1 mix of UDMH and hydrazine) as fuel and nitrogen tetroxide (N2O4) as oxidizer, rather than the previous nitric acid/UDMH.

The AJ10-118F engine produced  of thrust and was derived from the AJ10-138 engine used on the Transtage. It was used by the Delta-F upper stage of the Delta 1000 Straight Eight series rocket, starting in 1972.
This version also used Aerozine 50 as fuel and nitrogen tetroxide (N2O4) as oxidizer.

The AJ10-190 engine was used on the Space Shuttle Orbital Maneuvering System (OMS) for orbital insertion, on-orbit maneuvers, and de-orbiting, first flown in 1981. They produced  of thrust with a specific impulse (Isp) of 316 seconds. 
Following the retirement of the Shuttle, these engines were repurposed for use on the Orion spacecraft's  service module. This variant uses Monomethylhydrazine as fuel, with nitrogen tetroxide (N2O4) as oxidizer.

The AJ10-118K engine was used on the Delta II rocket's upper stage, Delta-K. It used Aerozine 50 as fuel and nitrogen tetroxide (N2O4) as oxidizer.  The AJ10-118K engine variant was used from 1989 and retired at the conclusion of the ICESat-2 launch on 15 September 2018.

References

Rocket engines using hypergolic propellant
Rocket engines using the pressure-fed cycle
Spacecraft propulsion